Four Christmases is a 2008 American Christmas comedy film about a couple visiting all four of their divorced parents' homes on Christmas Day. It stars Vince Vaughn and Reese Witherspoon with Robert Duvall, Jon Favreau, Mary Steenburgen, Dwight Yoakam, Tim McGraw, Kristin Chenoweth, Jon Voight, and Sissy Spacek in supporting roles. The film is director Seth Gordon's first studio feature film. It tells the story of a couple who must travel to four family parties after their vacation plans get cancelled due to a dense fog. The film is produced by New Line Cinema and Spyglass Entertainment and released by Warner Bros. Pictures on November 26, 2008.

It received generally negative reviews from critics but earned $163 million worldwide.

Plot

Brad and Kate are an upscale San Francisco couple. Both come from dysfunctional families: divorced parents and obnoxious siblings with out-of-control kids so they disdain the idea of getting married or having kids. They try to avoid their families at Christmas by traveling abroad, pretending to be doing charity work.

On the third Christmas of their relationship, they plan to go to Fiji but get trapped at San Francisco International Airport by a fog bank that cancels every outbound flight. The couple are also interviewed by a news crew, alerting their families they're stuck at home for the holidays.

Kate and Brad realize they can't get out of visiting Brad's father Howard first, then Kate's mother Marilyn, then Brad's mother Paula, and finally Kate's father Creighton—four Christmases in one day. Bracing themselves for a marathon of homecomings, Brad and Kate expect the worst.

They keep discovering new secrets about each other they had previously been too embarrassed to share, such as Brad's real name being "Orlando" and Kate's fear of inflatable castles (from a childhood trauma) and these strain their relationship. As Brad counts down the minutes to freedom, Kate studies their families' lives and realizes she does want marriage and children with Brad, the prospect of which frightens him when she mentions it.

When they finally reach Kate's father's house, she asks Brad to let her go in alone then gets out of the car and tells her family they have split up. Meanwhile, Brad returns to his father's and they have a quiet talk alone. Brad realizes he wants marriage and children with Kate. Returning to her, they discuss marriage and children before embarking to Fiji.

On New Year's Day a year later, Brad and Kate welcome their first child, a daughter, after spending nine months hiding the news from their families. As theirs is the New Year's baby, a news crew comes to congratulate them—once again revealing them, and their new baby, to their families.

Cast

 Vince Vaughn as Bradford “Brad” McVie, a man who was formerly Orlando McVie
 Reese Witherspoon as Kate Kinkaid, the girlfriend of Brad
 Robert Duvall as Howard McVie, the father of Brad
 Jon Favreau as Denver McVie, the older brother of Brad
 Mary Steenburgen as Marilyn Kinkaid, the mother of Kate
 Dwight Yoakam as Pastor Phil, a pastor
 Tim McGraw as Dallas McVie, the brother of Brad
 Kristin Chenoweth as Courtney, the sister of Kate
 Jon Voight as Creighton Kinkaid, the father of Kate
 Sissy Spacek as Paula, the mother of Brad
 Katy Mixon as Susan McVie
 Carol Kane as Aunt Sarah
 Colleen Camp as Aunt Donna
 Jack Donner as Grandpa
 Steve Wiebe as Jim
 Skyler Gisondo as Connor McVie
 Patrick Van Horn as Darryl
 Brian Baumgartner as Eric
 Cedric Yarbrough as Stan
 Haley Hallak as Baby Clementine
 True Bella Pinci as Kasi

One of the film's executive producers, Peter Billingsley, who had a starring role as Ralphie in the 1983 film A Christmas Story, has a credited role as an airline ticket agent.

Production
Prior to Vince Vaughn and Reese Witherspoon’s casting, it was announced that Spyglass Entertainment had set Adam Shankman to direct for Columbia Pictures.

Gordon was brought in as director at the insistence of Vaughn, who had seen Gordon's documentary The King of Kong: A Fistful of Quarters, a film, Gordon points out, which, like Four Christmases, has a "traditional three-act structure".

The film began production in December 2007, during the 2007–2008 Writers Guild of America strike, which meant that no changes could be made to the script.  During production, New Line Cinema became a "unit of Warner Bros.", which put the film's completion at risk.

Reception
The website's critical consensus reads, "Despite a strong cast, this sour holiday comedy suffers from a hackneyed script." At Metacritic, which assigns a normalized rating to reviews, the film has a score of 41 out of 100, based on 27 critics, indicating "mixed or average reviews". Audiences polled by CinemaScore gave the film an average grade of "B" on an A+ to F scale.

The Hollywood Reporter called the film "one of the most joyless Christmas movies ever" with "an unearned feel-good ending [that] adds insult to injury"; it criticized the film's script for "situat[ing] Hollywood clichés about Southern rednecks incongruously within the tony Bay Area".  Variety magazine called it an "oddly misanthropic, occasionally amusing but thoroughly cheerless holiday attraction that is in no way a family film".  The Associated Press said the film "began with some promise" then segued into "noisy joylessness [that] sets the tone for the whole movie"; the review noted that "Vaughn makes the movie tolerable here and there, but this kind of slapsticky physical comedy doesn't suit Witherspoon at all." Frank Lovece of Film Journal International found "no core to their characters. They just embody whatever plot machination the movie needs at any given moment", and that, "Every predictable Christmas-comedy trope gets dragged out like the string of electric lights that is pulled from the wall to whipsaw through the living room". Roger Ebert gave the film two stars out of four, and wrote his review in the style of a pitch session between a filmmaker and his boss, whereby he derided the film's alleged lack of humour or narrative sense.

Box office
On its opening day, a Wednesday, it ranked second at the box office with $6.1 million, behind the previous week's new release blockbuster Twilight. It then went on to take the top spot each successive day from Thursday to Sunday, earning $46.1 million and ranking #1 over the entire extended Thanksgiving holiday weekend. In its second weekend, Four Christmases held on to the #1 spot, taking in another $18.1 million.

The film grossed $120.1 million in the U.S. and $43.6 million in foreign countries, for a worldwide gross of $163.7 million.

Home media
The DVD and Blu-ray Disc was released on November 24, 2009.

Soundtrack

Four Christmases: Music from the Motion Picture was originally available to download from Amazon (MP3) or iTunes (MPEG-4), along with a digital booklet in portable document format which summarizes the credits of the album along with screenshots and other promotional images of the film. It was released on November 25, 2008, by New Line Records. The compact disc format was released on October 6, 2009, by Watertower Music.

 Track listing

 "Baby It's Cold Outside" by Dean Martin & Martina McBride  – 2:55
 "(There's No Place Like) Home for the Holidays" by Perry Como  – 2:51
 "Sleigh Ride" by Ferrante & Teicher  – 2:16
 "Christmas All Over Again" by Tom Petty  – 4:15
 "Season's Greetings" by Robbers On High Street  – 2:23
 "Jingle Bell Rock" by Bobby Helms with The Anita Kerr Singers  – 2:11
 "The Christmas Song" by Gavin DeGraw  – 3:24
 "Cool Yule" by Louis Armstrong  – 2:55
 "I'll Be Home for Christmas" by Dean Martin  – 2:33
 "White Christmas" by Bing Crosby  – 2:59
 "O Little Town of Bethlehem" by Sarah McLachlan  – 3:53

See also
 List of Christmas films

References

External links

 
 
 
 
 

2008 films
2000s Christmas comedy films
2008 romantic comedy films
American Christmas comedy films
American romantic comedy films
Films about dysfunctional families
Films about vacationing
Films set in San Francisco
German Christmas comedy films
English-language German films
German romantic comedy films
Films directed by Seth Gordon
Films produced by Roger Birnbaum
Films scored by Alex Wurman
Films with screenplays by Jon Lucas and Scott Moore
New Line Cinema films
Spyglass Entertainment films
Warner Bros. films
2000s English-language films
2000s American films
2000s German films